Leandro Aníbal Bazán (born 30 March 1990) is an Argentinian professional footballer who plays as a forward for Ecuadorian Serie A club Cumbayá.

References

External links 
 
 Leandro Bazán at HKFA
 
 Racing Club-Sitio Oficial

Living people
1990 births
Association football forwards
Racing Club de Avellaneda footballers
Club Social y Deportivo La Emilia players
Argentine footballers
Argentine expatriate footballers
Argentine expatriate sportspeople in Hong Kong
Expatriate footballers in Hong Kong
Hong Kong Premier League players
Hong Kong Rangers FC players
Ecuadorian Serie A players
People from San Nicolás de los Arroyos
Sportspeople from Buenos Aires Province